This is a list of airlines of Lao People's Democratic Republic.

Scheduled airlines

See also
 List of defunct airlines of Laos
 List of airlines
 List of defunct airlines of Asia

References

Airlines
Laos
Airlines
Laos